Ruth Milles (19April 187311February 1941) was a Swedish sculptor and writer. She is mainly known for her figurines and reliefs.

Early life and education 
Milles was born Ruth Anna Maria Andersson on Örby Manor in Vallentuna near Stockholm, Sweden. She was the daughter of Chief Verifier of the brännvin manufacturing in Sweden, August Emil Sebastian "Mille" Andersson (1843–1910) and his wife Walborg Alfhild Maria Tisell (1846-1879).  She had two siblings when her mother died in childbirth and gained three half siblings after her father remarried. Her brother was the sculptor Carl Milles (1875–1955) and her half-brother Evert Milles (1885–1960) was an architect. Unlike her brother Carl, Milles was a college educated artist. She studied at the Tekniska Skolan (the Technical School), predecessor to the Konstfack University College of Arts, Crafts and Design in Stockholm in 1892–93, after which she went on to the Royal Swedish Academy of Arts in 1894–98, where she was considered talented enough to skip a year. She would also visit the Theosophical Society which became influential for her future works.

Career 
In the autumn of 1898, Milles left for Paris, approximately a year after her brother Carl had moved there. She studied at the Académie Colarossi and École des Beaux-Arts, and used Paris as base for journeys through France and Germany. Milles and her brother spent much time together in Paris where they collaborated, artistically and economically, in a joint company they started. Among other things, the company sold small bronze figurines, depicting children and characters from fairy tales made by her. She spent the summers in the fishing village Briac in Bretagne where she would draw inspiration from the local fishers' life for her sculptures. Her sculptures were made in an early Impressionistic style. While in France, she and her brother changed their surname to Milles after their father's nickname. In 1902, she received an honorary award at the Salon in Paris. The next year she fell ill with tuberculosis. She travelled back to Sweden and settled down in Islinge on Lidingö, where she set up a studio which she sometimes shared with the wife of her brother Carl, Olga Milles (née Granner). 

Milles got many commissions from cultural institutions in Stockholm, among them the Royal Dramatic Theatre for medallions and busts of the singer Jenny Lind and the actor Georg Dahlqvist. In 1904–16, she participated in a number of international exhibitions like in St. Louis (1905) and Buenos Aires (1910), where she received silver medals for her work, Rome (1911), the world's fair in San Francisco (1915) and the Swedish art exhibition in Charlottenborg Spring Exhibition, Denmark (1916). However, her failing health forced her to abandon her sculpturing and she turned first to painting and later to writing instead. She also made illustrations for books, her own and those of other writers.

In 1932, she moved to Rome. Her health deteriorated, among other things she contracted gangrene and had one of her legs amputated. Milles died in Rome in 1941 and was buried in the Protestant Cemetery, Rome.

Milles is represented in the Nationalmuseum and the Thiel Gallery. There is also a bust and a painting by her in the home (Strand by lake Vättern) of Ellen Key.

Sculptures – a selection 

 Blåsväder ("Windy weather")
 Flitiga Kajsa ("Diligent Kajsa")
 Moder med barn ("Mother and child")
 Flicka med knyte ("Girl with bundle")
 Mjölkflicka ("Milkmaid")

Publications 
 Dagarnas grå och blommornas blå ("The Grey of the Days and the Blue of the Dreams") a collection of poems, Nationalförlaget (1918)
 Trollskrattet ("The Laughter of the Troll"), a children's tale, Åhlén & Åkerlund (1923)
 Didrik Flygare ("Didrik the Aviator"), a children's tale, Almqvist & Wiksell (1924)
 Glohit och Glodit ("Looky Here and Looky There"), a children's tale, Svenska andelsförlaget (1926)

References

Further reading

External links 

 Publications by Ruth Milles listed in LIBRIS

1873 births
1941 deaths
People from Vallentuna Municipality
Swedish women sculptors
Impressionist sculptors
Neoclassical sculptors
Bronzeware makers
20th-century medallists
Portrait artists
20th-century illustrators of fairy tales
Swedish children's book illustrators
Swedish women illustrators
Swedish women writers
Swedish-language writers
Swedish expatriates in Italy
Academic art
École des Beaux-Arts alumni
Académie Colarossi alumni
Realism (art movement)
19th-century Swedish sculptors
20th-century Swedish sculptors
19th-century Swedish women artists
20th-century Swedish women artists